The Adelaide Oval is a sports stadium located in Adelaide, South Australia. It was established in 1871 and has been used for a wide variety of sports, with the primary uses being cricket and Australian Rules Football. The first international cricket match was held on the ground in 1884 and it remains a major venue for Test cricket. The ground hosted its first One Day International (ODI) in 1975 and its first Twenty20 Internationals (T20I) in 2011, with both the Australian men's and women's teams playing T20Is at the ground on the same day. In addition, it has hosted women's Test and ODI matches and was the first ground at which a day-night Test was played.

In cricket, a five-wicket haul (also known as a "five-for" or "fifer") refers to a bowler taking five or more wickets in a single innings. This is regarded as a notable achievement. This article details the five-wicket hauls taken on the ground in official international Test and One Day International matches.

Three bowlers took five-wicket hauls in the first Test match played on the ground. England's Billy Bates took five wickets for 31 runs (5/31) in the first innings of the match in 1884. His team-mate Bobby Peel and Australia's Joey Palmer also took five-wicket hauls during the match. England's Johnny Briggs was the first player to take 10 wickets in a match, taking 5/51 and 6/49 in 1892, whilst the best Test match innings bowling figures on the ground were recorded by Australia's Albert Trott who took 8/43 in 1895. The first woman to take five wickets in an innings was Australia's Betty Wilson who took 5/23 in the first Woman's Test played on the ground in 1949.

The first One Day International five-wicket haul on the ground was taken by West Indian Andy Roberts who took 5/22 against England in 1980. The first ODI five-wicket haul taken by an Australian was by Carl Rackemann who took 5/16 against Pakistan in 1984, figures which remain the best ODI bowling figures at the venue.

Key

Test match five-wicket hauls

There have been a total of 117 five-wicket hauls taken in Test matches on the ground, including four taken in women's Tests.

Men's matches

Women's matches

One Day International five-wicket hauls

A total of 13 five-wicket hauls have been taken in ODIs on the ground.

Notes

References

External links 
International five-wicket hauls at the Adelaide Oval, CricInfo

Adelaide Oval
Five-wicket hauls, international